Embiotoca lateralis, commonly known as the striped surfperch or striped seaperch, is a species of surfperch native to the north-eastern Pacific Ocean.

Description
The striped surfperch is characterized by orange and blue stripes running lengthwise down the body and blue spots on the head and operculum. Individuals reach maximum lengths of 15 in (38 cm).

References

lateralis
Fish of North America
Fish of the Pacific Ocean
Taxa named by Louis Agassiz
Fish described in 1854